Les Fleurs du mal (English: "The Flowers of Evil") is an album by Léo Ferré, released in 1957 by Odeon Records. It is his first LP dedicated to a poet and this is the first time in popular music history a whole album is dedicated to a dead poet. Léo Ferré has set Baudelaire into music two more times : in 1967 with double album Léo Ferré chante Baudelaire, and with unfinished project Les Fleurs du mal (suite et fin), recorded in 1977 but posthumously released in 2008.

History

Track listing
Texts by Charles Baudelaire. Music composed by Léo Ferré.

Original LP

Personnel 
 Léo Ferré - voice, piano
 Jean-Michel Defaye - piano
 Jean Cardon - accordion
 Barthélémy Rosso - guitar
 Pierre Gossez - tenor saxophone
 Janine de Waleyne - ondes Martenot
 Fred Ermelin - double bass

External links 
 Album listening & presentation (French)

Léo Ferré albums
Les Fleurs du mal in popular culture
French-language albums
1957 albums
Musical settings of poems by Charles Baudelaire